Bruguiera exaristata, commonly known as the rib-fruited mangrove or rib-fruited orange mangrove, is a mangrove of the family Rhizophoraceae.

The species is pollinated by birds. The species also contains tropine esters of acetic, benzoic, n-butyric, isobutyric, propionic, and isovaleric acids. The tropane alkaloid  brugine is found in the bark of this species.

Description 
Bruguiera exaristata is a mangrove, forming mangrove swamps of small trees or shrubs with self-supporting growth in shallow saline or brackish water.

Distribution 
It is native to Lesser Sunda Islands, New Guinea and Northern Australia. It can be found along the coast at the mouth of the De Grey River, but it is rare in North West Cape.

References

External links

exaristata
Flora of New Guinea
Flora of the Lesser Sunda Islands
Flora of the Northern Territory
Flora of Queensland
Flora of Western Australia
Mangroves
Central Indo-Pacific flora